Teesta Khangtse Glacier or Tista Khangtse Glacier is located in the north of Sikkim, India, in a region bordering Tibet. This valley glacier is the primary source of the Teesta River.

Location

References 

Glaciers of the Himalayas